A tellurion (also spelled tellurian, tellurium, and yet another name is loxocosm), is a clock, typically of French or Swiss origin, surmounted by a mechanism that depicts how day, night, and the seasons are caused by the rotation and orientation of Earth on its axis and its orbit around the Sun. The clock normally also displays the age of the Moon and the four-year (perpetual) calendar.

It is related to the orrery, which illustrates the relative positions and motions of the planets and moons in the Solar System in a heliocentric model.

The word tellurion derives from the Latin tellus, meaning "earth".

See also
 Astronomical clock
 Solar System models

References

External links

Astronomical instruments
Astronomical clocks
Solar System models
Seasons

de:Orrery#Tellurium